Louis Falco (August 2, 1942 – March 26, 1993) was an American dancer and choreographer.

Life and career
Louis Falco was born in New York City of southern Italian immigrant parents. He began his study of dance in the 1950s at The Henry Street Playhouse with Murray Louis and Alwin Nikolais. He attended the High School of Performing Arts and as a student began performing with Charles Weidman. In 1960 he began dancing professionally with José Limón, and also appeared with Flower Hujer, Alvin Ailey and Donald McKayle. He danced with the José Limón Dance Company from 1960–70 and danced opposite Rudolf Nureyev in Limon's The Moor's Pavane on Broadway from 1974-75. His farewell performance was with Luciana Savignano at La Scala Opera House in Milan in The Eagle's Nest.  Falco was considered an extraordinarily gifted dancer and charismatic performer.

Falco made his debut as a choreographer in 1967. He was one of the first choreographers to experiment with rock bands and other innovations on stage, and he was noted for works created for his Louis Falco Dance Company and for his choreography of the 1980 motion picture Fame. After the explosive success of the film, he began a career in commercial choreography including music videos for a number of MTV artists. The Falco Company's last performance in New York City was for the inauguration of the Joyce Theater in 1982.

Falco completed choreography for several films and commissioned dance works, some of which were never performed in the United States. In 1986, he was recognized for a series of award winning television commercials. He died from AIDS in 1993.

Works
Selected works include:

Escargot
The Sleepers
Caviar
Journal
Argot
Huescape
Timewright
Caviar
The Eagle's Nest
Nights In A Spanish Garden
Tutti-frutti
Cooking French
Jack-In-The-Box
Reunion in Portugal
Journal
Eclipse
Caterpillar
The Lobster Quadrille
The Gamete Garden

Selected music videos:
Kiss for Prince
Why Can't I Have You for The Cars
Country Boy for Ricky Scaggs

References

External links

Official site

1942 births
1993 deaths
American choreographers
Artists from New York City
American male ballet dancers
Ballet choreographers
AIDS-related deaths in New York (state)
American people of Italian descent
20th-century American ballet dancers